Charles VI is an 1843 French grand opera in five acts with music composed by Fromental Halevy and a libretto by Casimir Delavigne and his brother Germain Delavigne.

The number "Guerre aux tyrans!" ("War on the tyrants!") achieved separate fame as a song of political protest.

Performance history
The opera was first presented on 15 March 1843 by the Paris Opera at the Salle Le Peletier. It continued to be performed there, and in a revised form beginning on 4 October 1847, up to 1848, and was revived again in 1850, receiving a total of 61 performances. Beginning on 5 April 1870 it was produced at the Théâtre Lyrique with Rosine Bloch in the role of Odette and was given there a total of 22 times.

Charles VI was also performed in French in Brussels (beginning on 2 October 1845), The Hague (25 April 1846), New Orleans (22 April 1847), Buenos Aires (4 May 1854), Batavia (27 April 1866), Barcelona (29 April 1871), Mexico (19 January 1882), and Marseille (8 April 1901). It was performed in German in Hamburg (13 February 1851) and in Italian in Milan (16 March 1876).

Performances in the 20th century were rare, but the opera was revived at Compiègne in 2005.

Roles
{| class="wikitable"
!Role
!Voice type
!Premiere Cast, (Conductor: - )
|-
|Le Dauphin, son of the King and heir to the French throne   
|tenor
|Gilbert Duprez
|-
|Charles VI, King of France   
|baritone
|Paul Barroilhet
|-
|Raymond, a farmer and former French soldier  
|bass
|Nicolas Levasseur
|-
|Odette, daughter of Raymond   
|mezzo-soprano
|Rosine Stoltz
|-
|Isabelle de Bavière, Queen of France
|soprano
|Julie Dorus-Gras
|-
|Le duc de Bedfort (Duke of Bedford), an English noble   
|tenor
|Canaple
|-
|L'homme de la forêt du Mans    
|tenor
|Jean-Étienne-Auguste Massol
|-
|Tanguy Duchâtel, a French commander
|bass
|Ferdinand Prévôt
|-
|Dunois
|baritone
|Octave
|-
|Lahire
|baritone
|Martin
|-
|Saintrailles
|tenor
|Saint-Denis
|-
|A student
|baritone
|Molinier
|-
|Gontran, a soldier
|tenor
|Placide Poultier
|-
|Lionel, an English officer
|tenor
|Raguenot
|-
|Louis d'Orléans, apparition
|tenor
|Brémond
|-
|Jean sans Peur, apparition
|tenor
|Brémond
|-
|Clisson, apparition
|tenor
|Brémond
|-
|Le jeune Lancastre, son of the Duke of Bedford
|silent
|
|-
|colspan=3| Chorus: French and English knights, lords and ladies of the court, French and English soldiers, pages, bourgeois, students, people
|-
|}

Synopsis
Place: France
Time: Several years after the battle of Agincourt

The opera centres on King Charles VI of France, who amid episodes of madness, is attempting to defeat the English invaders. The final scene takes place in the Abbey of Saint-Denis. Odette, a fictional predecessor of Joan of Arc, thwarts a plot by Queen Isabelle and the English nobleman Bedfort to displace the Dauphin with Bedfort's son Lancastre, and helps restore the Dauphin to his rightful place as heir to the throne of France. The King is dying as he and the assembled French swear to the Dauphin: Guerre aux tyrans! jamais en France, Jamais l'Anglais ne régnera ("War on the tyrants! never in France, Never shall the English reign").Pitou 1990, pp. 227–230.

Derivative works
 June 1, 1843, Théâtre du Gymnase, Paris — Lucrèce a Poitiers, ou Les écuries d'Augias, tragédie mêlée de vaudevilles by M. Léonard de Chatellerault; 
 March 16, 1847, Teatro alla Scala, Milan — , ballet by Jules Perrot.

References
Notes

Sources
 Chouquet, Gustave (1873). Histoire de la musique dramatique en France. Paris: Didot. View at Google Books.
 Delavigne, Casimir; Delavigne, G. (1878). Charles VI. Opéra en cinq actes. Musique de F. Halévy (libretto in French), pp. 221–233 in Chefs-d'oeuvre du théâtre Moderne, volume 1. Paris: Michel Lévy Frères. View at Google Books.
 Halévy, Fromental (ca. 1858). Charles VI. Opéra en 5 Actes. Paroles de MM. Germain et Casimir Delavigne. Musique de F. Halévy (piano-vocal score). Paris: Henry Lemoine. File #72489 at IMSLP.
 Jordan, Ruth (1994). Fromental Halévy: His Life & Music 1799–1862. London: Kahn & Averill. .
 Lajarte, Théodore (1878). Bibliothèque musicale du Théâtre de l'Opéra, volume 2. Paris: Librairie des Bibliophiles. View at Google Books.
Loewenberg, Alfred (1978). Annals of Opera 1597–1940 (third edition, revised). London, John Calder. . Totowa, New Jersey: Rowman and Littlefield. .
 Macdonald, Hugh (1992a). "Charles VI" in Sadie 1992, vol. 1, p. 821.
 Macdonald, Hugh (1992b). "Halévy, (Jacques-François-)Fromental (-Elie)" in Sadie 1992, vol. 2, pp. 598–600.
 Pitou, Spire (1990). The Paris Opéra: An Encyclopedia of Operas, Ballets, Composers, and Performers. Growth and Grandeur, 1815–1914. New York: Greenwood Press. .
 Sadie, Stanley, editor (1992). The New Grove Dictionary of Opera (4 volumes). London: Macmillan. .
 Thomson, Andrew (1995). "Review of Fromental Halevy: His Life and Work, 1799-1862" in The Musical Times, vol. 136, no. 1826 (April 1995), p. 198. .
 Walsh, T. J. (1981). Second Empire Opera: The Théâtre Lyrique Paris 1851–1870''. New York: Riverrun Press. .

External links
Revival at Compiègne

Operas by Fromental Halévy
1843 operas
Grand operas
Operas
Opera world premieres at the Paris Opera
Operas set in France
French-language operas
Libretti by Germain Delavigne
Libretti by Casimir Delavigne